Sunteck Realty Limited is a Mumbai-based real estate and construction company. It is engaged in construction, development and management of commercial and residential properties. The company is known for its high-end residential properties which are classified under different brand names: Signature for ultra-luxury properties, Signia for luxury properties and City for mid-segment properties. Among its notable projects is Signature Island in Bandra Kurla Complex, Mumbai. The company has received Ultra Luxury Project of the Year in 2017 and NDTV Property Award for Signature Island in 2016. The company has been listed as a Fortune Next 500 company for the year 2017, 2018, 2019 and 2020.

Background 
The company was set up by Kamal Khetan in 1981.  In March 2009, it came into a partnership with Oman based WJ Towell Group and Piramal Group and formed a 51:49 joint venture with Bank of Muscat for developing real estate projects in Oman. In November 2009, Sunteck raised ₹1.58 billion through QIP. In 2013, Piramal Group acquired a 3.5 per cent stake in the company.

It received an investment of $22.4 million from KKR & Co. Inc. for two residential projects of Sunteck Realty in February 2016. It has secured ₹650 crore through QIP in 2017. In November 2019, it was reported that the company sold around 2,000 flats at its Sunteck World project in Naigaon, Mumbai.

Awards

References

External links 
 Official website

Companies based in Mumbai
Real estate companies of India
Real estate companies established in 1991
1991 establishments in Maharashtra
Indian companies established in 1991
Companies listed on the National Stock Exchange of India
Companies listed on the Bombay Stock Exchange